Megalorhipida madoris is a moth of the family Pterophoridae that is known from Papua New Guinea

References

Oxyptilini
Moths described in 2007
Endemic fauna of Papua New Guinea
Taxa named by Cees Gielis